Petersburg Courthouse Historic District is a national historic district located at Petersburg, Virginia. The district includes 75 contributing buildings located in the central business district of Petersburg. It is centered on the Petersburg Courthouse and includes notable examples of Greek Revival, Italianate, Federal style architecture.  Notable buildings include the Paul-Lassiter House, Slaughter-Tatum House, Tabb Street Presbyterian Church Rectory, Mark E. Holt Jewelry Store, Augustus Wright Block, Virginia National Bank, Saal's Department Store, Remmie Arnold Pens Company building, A&P Super Market, Watson Court Apartments, and the Zimmer & Company Building.  Located in the district and separately listed are the Petersburg City Hall, Tabb Street Presbyterian Church, and Saint Paul's Church.

It was listed on the National Register of Historic Places in 1990.

References

Historic districts on the National Register of Historic Places in Virginia
Greek Revival architecture in Virginia
Federal architecture in Virginia
Italianate architecture in Virginia
Buildings and structures in Petersburg, Virginia
National Register of Historic Places in Petersburg, Virginia
Courthouses on the National Register of Historic Places in Virginia